The 2018–19 Martyr's Memorial A-Division League (Nepali: शहीद स्मारक ए डिभिजन लीग २०७५) season, also known as Pulsar Martyr's Memorial A-Division League for sponsorship reasons, was the 42nd edition of the Martyr's Memorial A-Division League since its establishment in 1954/55. A total of 16 teams competed in the league. The season began on 29 September 2018 and concluded on 8 January 2019. It was the first top division league held since the 2015 National League due to aftermath of the 2015 Nepal earthquake. On 16 September 2018, it was decided that there will be no relegation, however the two bottom placed teams would have two and one points deducted respectively in the following season.

Manang Marshyangdi Club were the defending champions and successfully defended their title on 28 December with two games to spare.

Teams
A total of 14 teams, all based in the Kathmandu Valley, contested the league. Four teams from other parts of Nepal; Jhapa XI, Morang XI, Lumbini F.C. and Far Western F.C., were initially supposed to participate in the league announced initially for 2017. The teams had previously participated in the 2015 National League.

On the other side, six teams, that did not participate in the 2015 league, made their comebacks in the league after participating in the 2013-14 season: Friends Club, Himalayan Sherpa Club, Jawalakhel Youth Club, Machhindra Football Club, Sankata BSC and Saraswoti Youth Club.

Team changes

Location

Personnel and kits

Head coaching changes

Foreign players 
On 16 May 2018, the All Nepal Football Association announced that the number of foreigners for each club would be four. One of those had to be from one of the countries of the SAARC Region.

Venues
The league was played centrally in three venues in two cities in the Kathmandu Valley. Nepal's main football stadium, Dasharath Rangasala was unavailable, as it was not yet reconstructed following the April 2015 Nepal earthquake.

League table

Positions by round

Season statistics

Top scorers

Clean sheets

Discipline

Player 

 Most yellow cards: 5
 Adama Doumbia (Jawalakhel Youth Club)
 Afeez Oladipo (Manang Marshyangdi Club)
 Most red cards: 1
 Ashish Gurung (Himalayan Sherpa Club)
 Bishwash Shrestha (Himalayan Sherpa Club)
 Bishwash Udas (APF Club)
 Francis Okechukwu (Saraswoti Youth Club)
 Gaurab Budhathoki (Chyasal Youth Club)
 Kuldip Karki (Jawalakhel Youth Club)
 Maxwell Ellon (Sankata BSC)
 Muhammed Asif (Manang Marshyangdi Club)
 Santosh Sahukhala (Chyasal Youth Club)
 Susan Lama (Saraswoti Youth Club)

Team 

 Most yellow cards: 21
 Jawalakhel Youth Club
Sankata BSC
 Most red cards: 2
 Chyasal Youth Club
 Himalayan Sherpa Club
 Saraswati Youth Club

Awards

Broadcast rights
All matches were streamed live on MyCujoo.

Notes

References

External links

RSSSF

Martyr's Memorial A-Division League seasons
2018–19 in Nepalese football
Nepal